The Sprague River is a tributary of the Williamson River, approximately  long, in southwestern Oregon in the United States. It drains an arid volcanic plateau region east of the Cascade Range in the watershed of the Klamath River.

The combined stream flows west through the broad Sprague Valley, past the small communities of Bly, Beatty, and Sprague River.

It receives the Sycan River from the north at Beatty. Superb trout fishing exists in the Sprague and its tributaries.

See also
 List of rivers of Oregon
 List of longest streams of Oregon

References

Rivers of Oregon
Wild and Scenic Rivers of the United States
Tributaries of the Klamath River
Rivers of Klamath County, Oregon
Rivers of Lake County, Oregon